Noel J. Shull (born May 28, 1942) is an American politician. He is a member of the Missouri House of Representatives, having served since 2013. He is a member of the Republican Party.

References

Living people
Republican Party members of the Missouri House of Representatives
1942 births
21st-century American politicians